Ali bin Masoud al Sunaidy (born December 28, 1964, in Muscat, Oman) is an Oman politician. He was Minister of Commerce and Industry in Oman. In 2018, he was Minister of Commerce and Industry and was the Deputy Chairman of the Oman Supreme Council for Planning.

References 

1946 births
Living people
People from Muscat, Oman
Government ministers of Oman
Commerce and industry ministers